Carpenter Park is a park in Carpentersville, IL, a suburb of Chicago. It was established in the 1850s and spans 20 acres. Community festivals, pick-up  sporting events, and ceremonies are often held in Carpenter Park due to its size.

Renovation
Carpenter Park is currently being renovated. The project started in April 2013, and has a $1 million budget. Many things were added and will be added, including new playground equipment and a gazebo. The mission of these renovations are "...to increase the attractiveness and diversity of the amenities in the parks system."

References

External links 
 Renovation Plans

Parks in Illinois
Kane County, Illinois